Saarah Smith (born 30 March 1999) is a South African cricketer. In August 2018, she was named in the South Africa Women's squad for their series against the West Indies Women. She made her Women's Twenty20 International cricket (WT20I) debut for South Africa against West Indies Women on 24 September 2018.

In October 2018, she was named in South Africa's squad for the 2018 ICC Women's World Twenty20 tournament in the West Indies. However, the following month, she was ruled out of the tournament due to an injury and replaced by Moseline Daniels.

In February 2019, Cricket South Africa named her as one of the players in the Powerade Women's National Academy intake for 2019. In September 2019, she was named in the Terblanche XI squad for the inaugural edition of the Women's T20 Super League in South Africa.

References

External links
 
 

1999 births
Living people
Place of birth missing (living people)
South African women cricketers
South Africa women Twenty20 International cricketers
North West women cricketers
Western Province women cricketers